Thair Ahmed (born 1 July 1959) is an Iraqi football coach, who coaches Al-Talaba.

Coaching career 
Ahmed began the 2018-2019 season with leading of Amanat Baghdad for 14 games, then he moved to his glory club Al-Talaba SC. He is coaching the elegant boys now.

Statistics

Managerial statistics

Honours

Managerial

Club
Al-Talaba
Iraqi Premier League: 2001–02
Iraq FA Cup: 2001–02, 2002–03
Iraqi Super Cup: 2002
Baghdad Day Cup: 2001

Erbil
Iraqi Premier League: 2007–08, 2008–09

Individual
Best manager of the 2003–04 Arab Champions League

References

External links
 

Living people
1959 births
Iraqi football managers
Al-Shorta SC managers
Al-Zawraa SC managers
Al-Quwa Al-Jawiya managers